Jitka Malovaná, originally Jitka Mašková (born 12 August 1955, in Český Krumlov) is a Czech sculptor, ceramicist, restorer and high school teacher.

Biography 
Between 1970–1974 she studied on the vocational school of ceramics in Bechyně. In 1974–1980 she absolved studies of sculpture on the Academy of Arts, Architecture and Design in Prague, in the studio of the professor Josef Malejovský. She practiced as a stone cutter, too. She married the sculptor Pavel Malovaný.

In 1997–2002 she participated on a restoration of Reliquary of St. Maurus by modeling additions of figures of saints. Stone sculpture she restored in the Lapidarium, Prague of the National Museum (1999–2015) and on Sidonie Nádherná von Borutín castle Vrchotovy Janovice (since 2002).

Teacher 
Since 2005 she has been learning modeling and sculpture on the Department of alternative and puppet theatre of the Academy of performing Arts in Prague. She also teaches drawing and painting on the Academy of the third Age (on the High school of economics in Prague).

Work 
She likes creation of figural statues, especially portrait heads, and drawing.

 Some artworks
 Bust of the Czech politician Oldřicha Černíka on his tomb in Slavín cemetery, brass, 1995, Prague – Vyšehrad
 Bust of the girl Ulrike von Levetzow, the last love of Johann Wolfgang Goethe; plaster, 2002; Regional Museum in Most, Lapidarium, Prague of the National Museum. 
 Bust of the Czech jazz singer Karel Hála, brass, 2016 (on his residence house in Prague).

Restoration
 Early gothic half-statue of saint Agnes of Bohemia from the St. Agnes Monastery in Prague (2006)

References

Literatura 
 Slovník českých a slovenských výtvarných umělců 1950 - 2005, Band 7., Chagall-centrum Ostrava 2001

External links 
 https://sp.amu.cz/stare/2016-2017/cs/ucitel113970.html.
 Informační systém AbART

1955 births
Living people
People from Český Krumlov
Artists from Prague
Czech women sculptors
Czech women ceramists
Czech schoolteachers